Valenciennes can mean:

 Valenciennes, a town and commune on the Scheldt river in the Nord département of northern France.
 Valenciennes FC a football (soccer) club from Valenciennes.
 Valenciennes lace
 Herman de Valenciennes, 12th century French poet.
 Achille Valenciennes (1794–1865), French zoologist.
 Pierre-Henri de Valenciennes (1750-1819), French painter
 Valenciennes Mountain, a summit in British Columbia, Canada
 Valenciennes River, a river in the Rocky Mountains of British Columbia, Canada